The Militia Act of 1855 was an Act passed by the Parliament of the Province of Canada that permitted the formation of an "Active Militia", which was later subdivided into the Permanent Active Militia and the Non-Permanent Active Militia, and divided the province into 18 military districts.

History 
Assisted by volunteer staff officers, each district was commanded by a colonel, while the entire operation was led by Colonel Étienne-Paschal Taché. Trained at the expense of taxpayers, the volunteers were armed, equipped and paid 5 shillings a day for 10 days of training a year (20 days for those in the artillery), with Captains being paid 10 shillings 6 pence a day, however, the men had to provide their own uniforms. Initially set at 5,000 men, the Act's popularity forced the government to double its size to 10,000 men by 1856. 

By 1858, enthusiasm waned when economic depression occupied the minds of Canadians. In 1860, military spirit was revived by the royal visit of the Prince of Wales. Canadians, Nova Scotians, and New Brunswickers launched their own volunteer units. These companies began to form into battalions that gradually eclipsed the Sedentary Militia. In 1864, the Sedentary Militia was re-styled as the "Non-Service Militia", and in 1869, its battalions were reduced to the "Reserve Militia" of each county. The Reserve Militia was last enrolled in 1873 (but never called out), deferred thereafter, and the theory that every able-bodied man was liable for service was finally abolished in 1950.

Exemption from military service: "Every person bearing a certificate from the Society of Quakers, Mennonites or Tunkers, or any inhabitant of Canada, of any religious denomination, otherwise subject to military duty, but who, from the doctrine of religion, is averse to bearing arms and refuses personal military service, shall be exempt from such service when balloted in time of peace, or war, upon such conditions and under such regulations as the Governor in Council, may, from time to time, prescribe." From 1869 to World War I, several orders in council were issued providing "entire exemption" for religious groups that the Canadian government was encouraging to immigrate to Canada. These were Mennonites from Russia (1873), Doukhobors (1898) and Hutterites (1899).

Ministers responsible

 Minister of Militia and Defence (non British Army units up to 1906) for the Province of Canada 1855 to 1867
 Minister of Militia and Defence 1867 to 1923
 Minister of National Defence 1923 to 1940

After 1940 the Militia became the Canadian Army with Active or Regular Forces and Reserve.

See also
 Canadian Militia
 Royal Canadian Artillery
 Volunteer Army (British)
 National Defence Act 1923
 Military Service Act, 1917
 Naval Aid Bill 1912
 Naval Service Act 1910 - gave rise to the Naval Service Act 1911
 Otter Commission 1920
 Kennedy Report on the Reserve Army
 Supplementary Order of Battle
 Unification of the Canadian Armed Forces

References

Citations

General references 
 
 

Canadian Militia
Military history of Canada
Province of Canada legislation
1855 in Canada
1855 in British law